The following is a list of military aircraft currently used by the four branches of the Italian Armed Forces: Italian Army, Italian Navy, Italian Air Force, and Carabinieri.

Air Force

Current inventory

Italian Army Aviation

Current inventory

Italian Naval Aviation

Current inventory

Carabinieri

See also
 Italian Armed Forces

References

Aviation in Italy

Italian military-related lists
Italian Military Aircraft